Elvira Cuevas Viera is a Puerto Rican ecologist. She is a professor in the department of biology at University of Puerto Rico, Río Piedras Campus where she serves as director of the Center for Applied Tropical Ecology and Conservation.

Early life and education 
Cuevas was born on August 20, 1950 in San Juan, Puerto Rico. She became interested in science at a young age and originally planned to go into medicine. She shifted to ecology after taking an ecology course under Herminio Lugo Lugo at the University of Puerto Rico, Río Piedras Campus (UPR-RP). She graduated with a bachelor's and master's degrees in biology at UPR-RP. Her 1975 master's thesis was titled Changes in selected water quality parameters as influenced by land use patterns in the Espiritu Santo drainage basin. Cuevas completed a Ph.D. in ecology at the Venezuelan Institute for Scientific Research (IVIC) in 1984. She was the first graduate in the field of ecology at IVIC in Venezuela. Her dissertation was titled Crecimiento de raices finas y su relacion con los procesos de descomposicion de materia organica y liberacion de nutrientes en bosques del alto Rio Negro en el territorio federal Amazonas. She was a postdoctoral fellow with the International Institute of Tropical Forestry.

Career 
Cuevas lived and worked in Venezuela for 25 years. In 2001, she joined the faculty at UPR-RP where she is a professor in the department of biology. She is the director of the Center for Applied Tropical Ecology and Conservation at UPR-RP. In May 2004, Cuevas became an adjunct faculty member in the department of management and conservation of natural resources in the faculty of veterinary and zootechnology at the Universidad Autónoma de Yucatán.

Research 
Cuevas researches ecosystem ecology, the processes and function of ecosystems, plant-soil interactions, nutrient cycling, and the carbon cycle. She also investigates the eco-hydrology of semi-arid systems and urban wetlands. Cuevas researches the ecophysiological responses of plants to climate change, climate variability, and heavy metal pollution in urban wetlands. She uses natural stable isotope technology to identify sources of water and carbon in the soil and evaluate plants' responses to water and nutrient availability.

Awards and honors 
In 2000, Cuevas was awarded a Guggenheim Fellowship to study plant sciences.

Personal life 
Cuevas is married and has a son. Both her husband and son are scientists.

Selected publications 
Cuevas' most cited publications include:

 Tiessen, H., Cuevas, E., & Chacon, P. (1994). The role of soil organic matter in sustaining soil fertility. Nature, 371(6500), 783-785.
 Martinelli, L. A., Piccolo, M. C., Townsend, A. R., Vitousek, P. M., Cuevas, E., McDowell, W., ... & Treseder, K. (1999). Nitrogen stable isotopic composition of leaves and soil: tropical versus temperate forests. Biogeochemistry, 46(1-3), 45-65.
 Tanner, E. V. J., Vitousek, P. A., & Cuevas, E. (1998). Experimental investigation of nutrient limitation of forest growth on wet tropical mountains. Ecology, 79(1), 10-22.
 Myers, R. J. K., Palm, C. A., Cuevas, E., Gunatilleke, I. U. N., & Brossard, M. (1994). The synchronisation of nutrient mineralisation and plant nutrient demand.
 Cuevas, E., & Medina, E. (1988). Nutrient dynamics within Amazonian forests. Oecologia, 76(2), 222-235.

References

External links 
 

Living people
1950 births
People from San Juan, Puerto Rico
Puerto Rican scientists
Puerto Rican women scientists
American ecologists
Women ecologists
21st-century American biologists
20th-century American women scientists
21st-century American women scientists
20th-century American biologists
American women biologists
American expatriate academics
American expatriates in Venezuela
Plant ecologists
University of Puerto Rico faculty
University of Puerto Rico, Río Piedras Campus alumni
Ecophysiologist
American women academics